Benzenehexol, also called hexahydroxybenzene, is an organic compound with formula  or . It is a six-fold phenol of benzene. The product is also called hexaphenol, but this name has been used also for other substances.

Benzenehexol is a crystalline solid soluble in hot water, with a melting point above 310°. It can be prepared from inositol (cyclohexanehexol). Oxidation of benzenehexol yields tetrahydroxy-p-benzoquinone (THBQ), rhodizonic acid, and dodecahydroxycyclohexane. Conversely, benzenehexol can be obtained by reduction of sodium THBQ salt with SnCl2/HCl.

Benzenehexol is a starting material for a class of discotic liquid crystals.

Benzenehexol forms an adduct with 2,2'-bipyridine, with 1:2 molecular ratio.

Benzenehexolate
Like most phenols, benzenehexol can lose the six H+ ions from the hydroxyl groups, yielding the hexaanion . The potassium salt of this anion is one of the components of Liebig's so-called "potassium carbonyl", the product of the reaction of carbon monoxide with potassium. The hexaanion is produced by trimerization of the acetylenediolate anion  when heating potassium acetylenediolate .

The lithium salt of this anion, Li6C6O6 has been considered for electric battery applications.

Esters
Hexahydroxy benzene forms esters such as the hexaacetate (-O(CO)CH3)6 (melting point 220 °C) and ethers like hexa-tert-butoxybenzene (-OC(CH3)3)6 (melting point 223 °C).

References

Phenols